Nová Ves I is a municipality and village in Kolín District in the Central Bohemian Region of the Czech Republic. It has about 1,300 inhabitants.

The Roman numeral in the name serves to distinguish it from the nearby village of the same name, Nová Ves II within the Rostoklaty municipality.

Administrative parts
The village of Ohrada is an administrative part of Nová Ves I.

References

Villages in Kolín District